"The Inner Light" is the 125th episode overall and the 25th and penultimate episode of the fifth season of the American science fiction television series Star Trek: The Next Generation. The episode was written by freelance writer Morgan Gendel based on his original pitch. It was partly inspired by the Beatles' song "The Inner Light", written by George Harrison and based on verses in the Tao Te Ching.  Gendel is credited as writer of the story and co-writer of the teleplay with Peter Allan Fields. It was first broadcast on June 1, 1992.

Set in the 24th century, the series follows the adventures of the Starfleet crew of the Federation starship Enterprise-D. In this episode, Captain Jean-Luc Picard (Patrick Stewart) is struck unconscious by an energy beam from an alien probe. While minutes pass for the rest of the crew, the probe makes Picard experience 40 years of lifetime as Kamin, a humanoid scientist whose planet is threatened by the nova of its sun. Toward the end of Kamin's "lifetime," Picard—who had come to accept his new life, though he never forgot his life on the Enterprise—learns that the purpose of the probe and the 40 years of virtual life it gave him was to keep alive the memory of Kamin's race long after the death of their civilization. Brought on board afterwards for analysis, the probe also contains Kamin's flute; Picard, having mastered it during his 40 years as Kamin, finds he retained the musical skills he learned and can still play it. He keeps it as a memento for the remainder of the series.

The episode is widely considered by critics and fans as one of the best episodes of the entire Star Trek franchise. In 1993, "The Inner Light" won the Hugo Award for Best Dramatic Presentation. The flute melody, featured prominently in the episode, was composed by Jay Chattaway and has since been re-arranged for a full orchestra. The episode has also been cited as a favorite by members of the show's cast and crew.

Plot
On stardate 45944.1, the Enterprise-D finishes a magnetic wave survey of the Parvenium system and finds an unknown probe. The device rapidly scans the ship and directs an energy beam at Captain Picard, who wakes up to find himself on Kataan, a non-Federation planet. His wife, Eline, tells Picard that he is Kamin, an iron weaver recovering from a fever. Picard speaks of his life on the Enterprise but Eline and their close friend Batai try to convince Picard that his memories were only dreams and incorporate him into their society as Kamin. Picard begins living his life as Kamin in his village, Ressik, having children with Eline and learning to play the flute. Kamin spends much time outdoors and with his Dobsonian telescope studying nature. As years pass, he begins to notice that the drought is caused by increased radiation from the planet's sun. He sends reports to the planet's leaders, who seem to ignore his concerns.

On Enterprise, the crew continues attempts to revive Picard. They try to block the influence of the probe but Picard nearly dies, so they are forced to let it continue. They trace the rocket's trajectory to a system whose sun went nova 1,000 years before, rendering life extinct in the system. Years pass and Kamin outlives Eline and Batai. Kamin and his daughter Meribor continue their study of the drought. They find that it is not temporary; the extinction of life on the planet is inevitable. Kamin confronts a government official who privately admits to him that they already know this but keep it secret to avoid panic. The official gravely points out to Kamin that they have only recently launched artificial satellites using primitive rockets: their race simply does not possess the technology to evacuate people before their planet is rendered uninhabitable.

One day, while playing with his grandson, Kamin is summoned by his adult children to watch the launch of a rocket, which everyone seems to know about except him. As he walks outside into the glaring nova light, Kamin sees Eline and Batai, as young as when he first saw them. They explain that he has already seen the rocket, just before he came there. Knowing that their planet was doomed, the planet's leaders placed memories of their society into a probe and launched it into space, in the hope that it would find someone who could tell others about their species. Picard realizes the context: "Oh, it's me, isn't it?", he says, "I'm the someone... I'm the one it finds", realizing that Kamin was the avatar they chose to represent their race.

Picard wakes up on the bridge of the Enterprise to discover that while he perceived many decades to have transpired, only 25 minutes have passed. The probe terminates and is brought aboard the Enterprise. Inside, the crew finds a small box. Riker gives the box to Picard, who opens it to find Kamin's flute. Picard, now adept at the instrument, plays a melody he learned during his life as Kamin.

Title

Morgan Gendel named the episode after "The Inner Light", a song written by George Harrison and released by the Beatles as the B-side of their 1968 single "Lady Madonna". The lyrics of Harrison's song were based on the 47th chapter of the Tao Te Ching, which reads:

Without going outside his door, one understands (all that takes place) under the sky; without looking out from his window, one sees the Tao of Heaven. The farther that one goes out (from himself), the less he knows. Therefore the sages got their knowledge without travelling; gave their (right) names to things without seeing them; and accomplished their ends without any purpose of doing so.

According to Gendel, the song "captured the theme of the show: that Picard experienced a lifetime of memories all in his head."

Ressikan flute

The brass Ressikan flute resembles, and has a similar sound to, a penny whistle or a tin whistle. It is considered a lasting reminder of Picard's virtual life on the planet throughout the rest of the series. Picard's flute could occasionally be seen in its box sitting on his desk. It plays a role in the episode "Lessons" where Picard develops a romantic relationship with a stellar cartographer assigned to the Enterprise, Nella Daren, an accomplished pianist who encourages his musical side and with whom he performs a duet version of the "Inner Light" theme. Earlier in the sixth season, a scene shows Picard practicing Mozart on the flute in the beginning of "A Fistful of Datas". Its final appearance was in a deleted scene from Star Trek Nemesis; Lieutenant Commander Data picks it up and examines it while discussing human life with Picard. The original placement of this scene was to have been immediately following the wedding ceremony shown in the opening scenes. The simple theme that Picard plays on the flute was later developed into a full orchestral suite for the 30th anniversary of Star Trek.

From October 5–7, 2006, the Ressikan flute was one of the items up for bid at the Christie's official studio auction of Star Trek memorabilia. Auction directors admitted that their estimates for many items did not "factor in that emotional fury generated around this kind of material". The estimate was later raised to $800–$1,200 on Christie's web site. In the days leading up to the auction, Denise Okuda, former Trek scenic artist and video supervisor, as well as co-writer of the auction catalog, said: "That's the item people say they really have to have, because it's so iconic to a much-beloved episode." The final bid for the flute at the auction was US$40,000.

Critical reception
This episode won the 1993 Hugo Award for Best Dramatic Presentation. The award was given at the World Science Fiction Convention in San Francisco. "The Inner Light" was the first television program to be so honored since the Star Trek: The Original Series episode "The City on the Edge of Forever" won in 1968. The other Hugo Award-winning Star Trek episodes are "The Menagerie" (the only two-part episode of the original series) and "All Good Things..." (the series finale of The Next Generation).

The episode was also nominated in 1993 for an Emmy award for Makeup in a series, but lost to Star Trek: Deep Space Nine's "Captive Pursuit".

The episode is the favorite episode of actor Patrick Stewart, who played Captain Jean-Luc Picard. Star Trek writer Susan Sackett notes that it is also her favorite episode even though it is not one she wrote. "The Inner Light" was ranked among the top five episodes in a "viewers' choice" marathon that was broadcast just before the premiere of the series finale. IO9 ranked "The Inner Light" as the 8th best episode of all Star Trek episodes up to 2011.

Variety called it the best Star Trek: The Next Generation episode. The Hollywood Reporter ranked "The Inner Light" as the 4th best Star Trek episode of all 700+ episodes in 2016. The flute solo, composed by Jay Chattaway was noted as one of the famous pieces of music from Star Trek.

In 2015, The Hollywood Reporter noted this episode's presentation of Picard remembering his probe-life and quietly playing the Ressikan flute in his cabin as one of the top ten "most stunning" moments of Star Trek: The Next Generation.

In 2016, Empire ranked this the tenth best out of the top 50 episodes of all the 700+ Star Trek television episodes.

In 2016, Radio Times magazine said that Picard playing the flute at the end of the episode was the 6th greatest scene of all Star Trek film and television.

In 2017, Screen Rant rated "The Inner Light" as the 3rd most romantic episode of Star Trek for the relationship between the Picard and Eline characters.

In 2017, Fatherly ranked this episode as one of the top 10 episodes of Star Trek for kids to watch.

In 2017, Nerdist ranked this episode the second best of Star Trek: The Next Generation.

In 2017, Den of Geek ranked this episode as one of top 25 "must watch" episodes of Star Trek: The Next Generation.

In 2017, Vulture.com listed "The Inner Light" as one of the best episodes of Star Trek: The Next Generation.

In 2018, Popular Mechanics listed "The Inner Light" as one of the top 12 episodes for the Jean-Luc Picard character. The episode was noted as not having a traditional villain, rather it was more of a misunderstanding between two cultures as Picard was forced to live an entire life in the space of a few minutes of normal time.

In 2019, Screen Rant ranked "The Inner Light" as one of the top ten important episodes to watch in preparation for the series Star Trek: Picard.

In 2019, The Hollywood Reporter listed this among the twenty five best episodes of Star Trek: The Next Generation.

In 2020, CNET called the episode "great TV", "heartrending stuff" and "Trek at its finest".

In 2020, The Digital Fix said this was the second best episode of Star Trek:The Next Generation, calling it a "rich, powerful, piece of storytelling" and praising Patrick Stewart's acting as Picard contending with an experience outside his usual job of Starship captain.

In 2021, Robert Vaux writing for CBR, highlighted this episode among a trio of season five episodes (along with "The Perfect Mate" and "Darmok") that Patrick Stewart really shined in. He points out the episode is "widely cited as one of the best Trek episodes of any kind."

Media releases 
A DVD release came as part of The Best of Star Trek: The Next Generation – Volume 2 on November 17, 2009, in the United States.

Notes

See also
 "Puhoy"

References

Further reading

External links

 

 Morgan Gendel Celebrates "The Inner Light" at startrek.com (2 July 2013)

1992 American television episodes
Hugo Award for Best Dramatic Presentation winning works
Star Trek: The Next Generation (season 5) episodes
Television episodes about simulated reality